Borisovo-Okolitsy is a rural locality (a village) in Zaraysky District of Moscow Oblast, Russia, located  northeast from the town of Zaraysk. Population: 52 (2005 est.).

References

Rural localities in Zaraysky District, Moscow Oblast